"Papa, Can You Hear Me?" is a 1983 song composed by Michel Legrand with lyrics by Alan Bergman and Marilyn Bergman, for Barbra Streisand in the title role of Yentl.  The song was nominated for Best Original Song at the 56th Academy Awards; Streisand's longtime friend Donna Summer performed it during the ceremonies. The song peaked at No.26 at Billboard's Adult Contemporary.

Critical reception 
Herald-Journal deemed it "forgettably gooey". Ottawa Citizen negatively compared the song to the Star Wars theme, postulating that only the most loyal Streisand fans would make a cognitive connection to the musical upon hearing the tune.
Chicago Sun-Times deemed it "emotional". Newsweek International said it was a "gay anthem".
However, for many Jews, and others who have lost a father, "Papa Can You Hear Me" is comparable to the treasured "My Yiddishe Momme", the moving lament for those who have lost a mother. Healing Times: A Personal Workbook created a therapeutic exercise based around the song.

Covers
Singer and pianist Nina Simone recorded the song in 1993 on her final album A Single Woman. Her father had died in the 1970s.

Charlotte Church recorded the song as the 5th track on her 2001 album Enchantment.

West End performer Meredith Braun recorded the song on her 2012 album "Someone Else's Story"

In 2010, Glee did a cover in their episode 'Grilled Cheesus', sung by Lea Michele.

Iranian songstress Helen Matevosian covered it in her studio album "Oghyanoose Khali" ("Empty Ocean").

In 2006 at her "Un Regard 9" concert in Paris, Lara Fabian, the Belgian-Canadian singer, paid homage to Streisand's voice then sang the song live.

Popular culture
A parody of the song is briefly sung near the end of the film Austin Powers in Goldmember when Goldmember is shocked by his tractor beam device and sings "Fahza can you hear me".

The musical Spamalot features a song called "You Won't Succeed on Broadway (If You Don't Have Any Jews)" which refers greatly to Jewish influence on musicals. At a certain point during the song, the lead singer, Sir Robin calls out, "Arthur, can you hear me?!"

The song was referenced in the BBC comedy series Beautiful People in Episode 2 of the first series, "How I Got My Nose". A brief excerpt is sung by the character of Debbie Doonan, as played by Olivia Colman.

In the episode of The Simpsons "Sleeping with the Enemy", Bart overhears Nelson singing the song while Nelson is staying with the family, as an ode to Nelson's missing father.

In an episode of the show Will & Grace, Jack sings the song on separate occasions, as does Will in an earlier episode while visiting a therapist.

In the "Grilled Cheesus" episode of Glee, Rachel sings the song for Burt Hummel (who is in a coma) and his son Kurt. Rachel sings the song outside (a nod to Yentl in the film) and later beside Burt's hospital bed, together with Mercedes, Quinn, Finn, and Carol, while Kurt watches from outside the room, feeling emotional.

The instrumental version of the song is frequently used as background music in figure skating competitions.

The song is featured several times in Deadpool 2 where a running joke is made out of the title character Deadpool noticing (initially while watching the film Yentl with his girlfriend), the "obvious" similarities between it and the song "Do You Want to Build a Snowman?" from the film Frozen. As he is dying towards the end of the film, Deadpool sings the song's chorus to his teammates.

References

1980s ballads
1983 songs
Songs written for films
Barbra Streisand songs
Nina Simone songs
Songs with lyrics by Alan Bergman
Songs with lyrics by Marilyn Bergman
Songs with music by Michel Legrand
Pop ballads
LGBT-related songs